Albert Prisco (January 28, 1890 – ?) was an American actor born in Naples, Italy. He appeared in 28 films between 1921 and 1935.

Filmography

External links

1890 births
20th-century American male actors
American male film actors
American male silent film actors
Italian emigrants to the United States
Year of death missing